Alexandre Di Estefano Marcena Rodrigues (born February 5, 1993), more commonly known as Alexandre Balotelli, is a Brazilian footballer who plays as a forward for Thai League 2 club Customs United.

Honours
Thai League 3
  Runners-up : 2021–22

Thai League 3 Southern Region
  Winners : 2021–22

References

External links

1993 births
Living people
Brazilian footballers
J3 League players
Alexandre Balotelli
Alexandre Balotelli
SC Sagamihara players
Alexandre Balotelli
Place of birth missing (living people)
Association football forwards